St Day and Lanner was an electoral division of Cornwall in the United Kingdom. As a division of Cornwall County Council, it returned one member from 1973 to 1985, when it was superseded by St Day, Lanner and Carharrack. A division to the unitary authority Cornwall Council was also called St Day and Lanner, returning one councillor from 2009 to 2013, after which it was replaced by Carharrack, Gwennap and St Day and Lanner and Stithians.

Election results

Cornwall Council division

Extent
St Day and Lanner covered the villages of St Day, Lanner, and the hamlets of Busveal, Trevarth, Pennance. It also covered part of Scorrier which was shared with the Redruth North, Mount Hawke and Portreath and Chacewater and Kenwyn divisions. The division covered 1006 hectares in total.

2009 election

Cornwall County Council division

1981 election

1977 election

1973 election

See also

Politics of Cornwall

References

Electoral divisions of Cornwall Council
Electoral divisions of Cornwall County Council